Kerstin Vieregge (born 6 September 1979) is a German politician. Born in Rinteln, Lower Saxony, she represents the CDU. Kerstin Vieregge has served as a member of the Bundestag from the state of North Rhine-Westphalia since 2017.

Political career 
Vieregge became a member of the Bundestag after the 2017 German federal election. She is a member of the Defence Committee and the Tourism Committee. Since 2022, she has also been part of the German delegation to the Parliamentary Assembly of the Organization for Security and Co-operation in Europe.

References

External links 

  
 Bundestag biography 

1979 births
Living people
Members of the Bundestag for North Rhine-Westphalia
Female members of the Bundestag
21st-century German women politicians
Members of the Bundestag 2021–2025
Members of the Bundestag 2017–2021
Members of the Bundestag for the Christian Democratic Union of Germany